is a town in Yamagata District, Hiroshima Prefecture, Japan.

Kitahiroshima was formed on February 1, 2005 from the merger of the towns of Chiyoda, Geihoku, Ōasa and Toyohira, all from Yamagata District.

Geography

Climate
Kitahiroshima has a humid subtropical climate (Köppen climate classification Cfa) characterized by cool to mild winters and hot, humid summers.

Demographics
Per Japanese census data, the population of Kitahiroshima in 2020 is 17,763 people. Kitahiroshima has been conducting censuses since 1920.

References

External links

  

Towns in Hiroshima Prefecture